Carlos Francisco Portinho, also known as Portinho (born 2 July 1973), is a Brazilian politician and lawyer. In 2018, he was elected first substitute for senator in Rio de Janeiro.

Portinho took office in the Senate on 3 November 2020 as Senator for Rio de Janeiro, due to the passing of Arolde de Oliveira, at the age of 83, victim of COVID-19, who had organ failure caused by the disease.

In the public service, Portinho had served as Municipal Secretary of Housing during Eduardo Paes administration in Rio de Janeiro, State Secretary of Environment in the Luiz Fernando Pezão administration and Municipal Subsecretary of Housing in Marcelo Crivella administration.

In the private sector, as lawyer specialized in sports law, Portinho was juridical Vice President of Flamengo.

References

|-

1973 births
Living people
People from Rio de Janeiro (city)
Liberal Party (Brazil, 2006) politicians
20th-century Brazilian lawyers
21st-century Brazilian politicians